Leigh Street Baptist Church is a historic Southern Baptist church in Church Hill North Historic District which is in Richmond, Virginia. It was designed by architect Samuel Sloan and built between 1854 and 1857. It is a three-story, Greek Revival style stuccoed brick structure.  It features a Grecian Doric, pedimented portico with six fluted columns and a full entablature which continues around the side of the church.  Additions were made in 1911, 1917, and 1930.

It was listed on the National Register of Historic Places in 1972.

References

External links
Leigh Street Baptist Church website

Churches on the National Register of Historic Places in Virginia
Greek Revival church buildings in Virginia
Churches completed in 1857
19th-century Baptist churches in the United States
Baptist churches in Virginia
Churches in Richmond, Virginia
National Register of Historic Places in Richmond, Virginia
1857 establishments in Virginia
Southern Baptist Convention churches